Sangbar or Sang Bor or Sangbor may refer to:
 Sangbor, Afghanistan
 Sangbor, Fars, Iran
 Sangbar, Dargaz, Razavi Khorasan Province, Iran
 Sangbar, Mashhad, Razavi Khorasan Province, Iran